Macedonian Voice, in Russian: Makedonskij Golos, in Macedonian: Makedonski Glas, was a newspaper that was published in Saint Petersburg in 1913–14.  The newspaper was published in the Russian language. The newspaper started reporting news from Macedonia from that period, was publishing patriotic poems and was presenting views on the Macedonian question. The editor in all the editions of the newspaper was Dimitrija Čupovski. The newspaper was bulletin of a group of Slav Macedonian students in Russia, and it promoted the notion of a separate Macedonian people as distinct from the Greeks, Bulgarians and Serbs. The editors were struggling for popularizing the idea for an independent Macedonian state as is shown on the front page of the first edition published on June 9, 1913. The newspaper also made a design of the first flag of independent Macedonia on the 2nd page in the 9th edition of the newspaper on March 2, 1914. The Macedonian flag had horse, in the left top corner and sun in the right bottom corner over which is written "The One Independent Macedonia"

Before this newspaper was created, a number of Bulgarian language newspapers and societies of the same name were founded in the region of Macedonia, Bulgaria and also the United States by Macedonian Bulgarians. The historical importance for Macedonism of this newspaper has meant that numerous Macedonian language newspapers in Sweden, Australia, the United States and Bulgaria have been published later, that were named 'Macedonian Voice'. All of these newspapers have since closed.

References 

Macedonian Voice (Makedonski Glas) (photographic edition), 1968, Skopje: Institute for National History

See also
Dimitrija Čupovski
Macedonian Scientific and Literary Society

Newspapers published in North Macedonia
Russian-language newspapers
Macedonian Scientific and Literary Society